Pantufo is a town in the Água Grande District of São Tomé and Príncipe. It is located on the coast, 3 km southeast from the capital São Tomé. Its population is 1,836 (2012 census). It is considered the only urban settlement in the country, apart from the capital.

Population history

Sporting clubs
Futebol Club Aliança Nacional - football (soccer)

References

Populated places in Água Grande District
Populated coastal places in São Tomé and Príncipe